Fox Township, Illinois may refer to:

 Fox Township, Kendall County, Illinois
 Fox Township, Jasper County, Illinois

See also 
 Fox Township (disambiguation)

Illinois township disambiguation pages